Terror Squad was an American hip hop collective that was first established in 1998. Based in the Bronx borough of New York City, the members of Terror Squad collectively debuted on a song in member Fat Joe's albums Jealous One's Envy and Don Cartagena. Terror Squad released its debut album, Terror Squad: The Album, in 1999, with its first major hit "Whatcha Gon' Do", credited mostly to Big Pun, who died of a heart attack in 2000. After Big Pun's death, his longtime partners Cuban Link and Triple Seis left the group and were subsequently replaced by Remy Martin (later known as Remy Ma) and Tony Sunshine. In 2004, their song "Lean Back" peaked at No. 1 on the Billboard Hot 100.

History
In 1998, the members of Terror Squad debuted as a group on Fat Joe's album Don Cartagena. Terror Squad, in its debut album Terror Squad: The Album, consisted of rappers Fat Joe, Big Pun, Cuban Link, Prospect, Armageddon, and Triple Seis.

As the group was on hiatus following Pun's death, most of its former members fell into obscurity, with Fat Joe having the most successful solo career among all the former members. The group reunited and released their second album, True Story, in 2004. It included the summer club hit "Lean Back", produced by Scott Storch, which peaked at number one on the Billboard Hot 100 and 24 in the UK. A remix to "Lean Back" featured Lil Jon, Mase and Eminem was released on Fat Joe's 2005 album All or Nothing. Although the album failed to spawn other hit singles, Fat Joe and Remy, who contributed the vocals to "Lean Back", went on to release high-selling solo albums in 2006. Fat Joe commented in a 2006 interview that Armageddon and Prospect had become lazy.

Terror Squad signed to Koch Records that next year. Apart from the three new members, DJ Khaled and Cool & Dre are retained as regular crew along with Tony Sunshine. Tony Sunshine has since left Terror Squad to pursue a solo career. Furthermore, Terror Squad has since recruited affiliates from Texas, Florida, California, the Middle East, and Africa.

Line-up

 Fat Joe (Joseph Cartagena)
 Big Pun (Christopher Rios)
 Tony Sunshine (Antonio Cruz)
 Cuban Link (Felix Delgado)
 Armageddon (John Eaddy)
 Prospect (Richard Perez)
 Triple Seis (Sammy Garcia)
 Remy Ma (Reminisce Mackie)
 DJ Khaled (Khaled Mohamed Khaled)
 Cool & Dre (Marcello "Cool" Valenzano and Andre "Dre" Lyon)

Discography

Albums

Singles

References

Atlantic Records artists
MNRK Music Group artists
Hip hop collectives
Hip hop groups from New York City
Musical groups established in 1998
Universal Records artists
Hardcore hip hop groups
Rappers from the Bronx
Musical groups from the Bronx